Fiona Morrison Porta (born 18 May 1970) is an Andorran windsurfer who competed at the 1996 Summer Olympics.

Morrison competed in the Women's Mistral One Design windsurfing event at the 1996 Summer Olympics, and after her nine races she ended with a net total of 153 points and finished in 24th place out of 27 starters.

Notes

References

External links
 
 
 

1970 births
Living people
Andorran windsurfers
Female windsurfers
Andorran female sailors (sport)
Olympic sailors of Andorra
Sailors at the 1996 Summer Olympics – Mistral One Design